Abergwynfi railway station served the villages of Abergwynfi and Blaengwynfi in Neath Port Talbot, Wales. The station was the terminus of the line from Bridgend via Maesteg.

History

Opened by the Great Western Railway, the station passed on to the Western Region of British Railways on nationalisation in 1948. It was closed by the British Transport Commission.

The nearby Blaengwynfi railway station was on the Rhondda and Swansea Bay Railway.

The site today

The site is a small wooded area in the village, next to the River Gwynfi.

References

 
 
 Station on navigable O.S. map
 Railscot Llynvi Valley Extension 

Disused railway stations in Neath Port Talbot
Former Great Western Railway stations
Railway stations in Great Britain opened in 1886
Railway stations in Great Britain closed in 1960